Antonius Sanderus (Antwerp, 15 September 1586 – Affligem, 10 January 1664) was a Flemish Catholic cleric and historian.

Biography
Sanderus was born "Antoon Sanders", but like all writers and scholars of his time he Latinized his name. Having become master of philosophy at the University of Douai in 1609, he studied theology for some years under Johannes Malderus (Jan van Malderen) at the University of Leuven, and Willem Hessels van Est (Estius) at Douai, and was ordained priest at Ghent.

For some years he was engaged in parochial duties, and combated the Anabaptist movement in Flanders with great zeal and success. In 1625, he became secretary and almoner of Cardinal Alfonso de la Cueva, later becoming canon and scholaster of St Martin's Cathedral, Ypres. Publication of the first volume of his sumptuously illustrated Flandria illustrata (1641) nearly bankrupted him, and he was rescued from ruination by an award of 1,000 florins through the Lille Chamber of Accounts. Further such subventions in support of his work followed in 1645, 1651, 1655 and 1662.

In 1654, he was appointed penitentiary at Ypres. After three years, however, he resigned this office to devote himself entirely to scientific, and especially to historical studies. He soon found himself compelled to claim the hospitality of the Benedictine Abbey of Afflighem, since he had reduced himself to absolute poverty by the publication of numerous works.

Writings
He combined high intellectual gifts with great zeal, and left behind forty-two printed, and almost as many unprinted, works. The most important are the following:
 De scriptoribus Flandriae libri III (Antwerp, 1624)
 De Gandavensibus eruditionis fama claris (Antwerp 1624)
 De Brugensibus eruditionis fama claris libri II (Antwerp, 1624)
 Hagiologium Flandriae sive de sanctis eius provinciae liber unus (Antwerp, 1625; 2nd ed., Lille, 1639).

A general edition of these four works appeared under the title: Flandria illustrata (2 volumes, Cologne, 1641–44; The Hague, 1726).

Of his other works may be mentioned:
 Elogia cardinalium sanctitate, doctrina et armis illustrium (Louvain, 1625)
 Gandavium sive rerum Gandavensium libri VI (Brussels, 1627)
 Bibliotheca belgica manuscripta (2 parts, Lille, 1641–3)
 Chorographia sacra Brabantiae sive celebrium in ea provincia ecclesiarum et coenobiorum descriptio, imaginibus aeneis illustrata (Brussels, 1659; The Hague, 1726); this is his chief work.

References

External links

1586 births
1664 deaths
17th-century Latin-language writers
Flemish priests
Flemish historians
Clergy from Antwerp
Old University of Leuven alumni
University of Douai alumni
Writers from Antwerp